Ruy Teixeira (born December 15, 1951) is an American political scientist and commentator who has written several books on various topics in political science and political strategy. He is most noted for his work on political demography, and particularly for The Emerging Democratic Majority (2002), which he co-wrote with John Judis, a book arguing that the Democratic Party are demographically destined to become a majority party in the United States of the early 21st century. He writes and edits the weblog The Democratic Strategist.

Life and career

Teixeira was born in Washington, D.C. to Bernardo and Marie (née Overmeyer) Teixeira. He has one older sibling, Diogo Teixeira, a businessman, and one younger half-brother, Bernardo de Albergaria, a marketing executive. Teixeira's parents were divorced when he was quite young, and he grew up strongly influenced by his mother, who was an artist, painter, and teacher.

Teixeira skipped a grade in junior high and graduated from Bethesda Chevy Chase High School at the age of 16. After high school, he attended Yale College and the University of Michigan, from which he received his B.A. (1977). Later, he received his M.S. and Ph.D. (1984) in sociology from the University of Wisconsin at Madison, where he did his dissertation on declining voter turnout.

After graduate school, he moved to New York and worked for a polling firm for a year before moving down to Washington to do consulting work, chiefly at Abt Associates.  In 1987, his dissertation was published as the book, Why Americans Don’t Vote by Greenwood Press.  The book was well received and led to several writing assignments in Public Opinion Quarterly and The New Republic on the role of voter turnout in the 1988 election.  The articles were widely cited as showing definitively that increased voter turnout was not the solution to the Democrats’ electoral woes—a hotly debated thesis at that time within the Democratic Party.

He left consulting after several years and moved over to a government job at the Economic Research Service where he researched labor market issues, chiefly the so-called skills mismatch between low-skilled and high-skilled workers.  From there, he moved as a visiting fellow to the Brookings Institution, where in 1992 he published the book, The Disappearing American Voter, now a standard reference work on voter turnout.  Afterwards, he moved to the Progressive Policy Institute, the think tank of the Democratic Leadership Council, to start a political studies program.  In 1994, he moved to another think tank, the Economic Policy Institute (EPI), to direct their Politics and Public Opinion Program and he stayed there until 1999.

In 1999, he moved to the Century Foundation’s Washington office, where he is a Senior Fellow and in 2003 he became a Senior Fellow of a newly formed think tank, the Center for American Progress, headed by John Podesta, Chief of Staff to President Bill Clinton and co-chair of President Barack Obama's transition team.

Teixeira is a Senior Fellow at both the Century Foundation and the Center for American Progress. He is also a guest scholar at the Brookings Institution, where he co-directed a joint Brookings-American Enterprise Institute project on political demography and geography, “The Future of Red, Blue and, Purple America,” and wrote a series of reports with William Frey on the political geography of battleground states in the 2008 election. In July 2022, Teixeira left the Center for American Progress, joining the American Enterprise Institute as a nonresident senior fellow focusing "on the transformation of the party coalitions and the future of American electoral politics."

He is the author or co-author of six books, including Red, Blue and Purple America: The Future of Election Demographics; The Emerging Democratic Majority; America’s Forgotten Majority: Why the White Working Class Still Matters; and The Disappearing American Voter, as well as hundreds of articles, both scholarly and popular. He also writes Public Opinion Snapshot, a weekly feature featured on the CAP and TCF websites.

Teixeira's book, The Emerging Democratic Majority, written with John Judis (Scribner, 2002), was the most widely discussed political book of that year and generated praise across the political spectrum, from George Will on the right to E.J. Dionne on the left. It was selected as one of the best books of the year by The Economist magazine.

Teixeira's writings include "Demographic Change and the Future of the Parties," "The European Paradox" (with Matt Browne and John Halpin), “New Progressive America,” "New Progressive America: The Millennial Generation" (with David Madland), and “The Decline of the White Working Class and the Rise of a Mass Upper Middle Class” (with Alan Abramowitz).

References

External links
Biography at the Center for American Progress
Video (and audio) debate/discussion about the future of the Republican and Democratic parties with Teixeira and Ross Douthat on Bloggingheads.tv
Video (and audio) discussion involving Ruy Teixeira and Reihan Salam on Bloggingheads.tv
Is there (still) an emerging progressive majority in the United States ? by Ruy Teixeira, published on Sens Public

The Democratic Strategist

1951 births
American bloggers
American Enterprise Institute
Bethesda-Chevy Chase High School alumni
Center for American Progress people
Living people
People from Washington, D.C.
University of Michigan alumni
University of Wisconsin–Madison College of Letters and Science alumni
Yale College alumni